Martha Richler (born October 11, 1964) is an artist and radio presenter. Working for the Evening Standard, she was the first woman to produce a daily cartoon at Associated Newspapers and for London-based newspapers known collectively as "Fleet Street". Her father is the writer Mordecai Richler and her mother is Florence Richler, who introduced her to art and music. Her pen-name, Marf, also her preferred name on-air. She hosts a late-night radio show called Night Train, for Radio Winchcombe in Gloucestershire, spotlighting female musicians in the UK. She is an ambassador for The F-List for Music, founded by Vick Bain, supporting female musicians across the UK. Martha Richler produced, wrote, and presented a series in 2022 called Inner Voices for Resonance FM, an innovative radio station supporting new and experimental music. She completed her MA in Radio Production at Birmingham City University, studying with the music documentary maker Sam J. Coley. She holds degrees from Harvard University, Columbia University, New York University, and The Johns Hopkins University, all in art history. She wrote the official guide to The National Gallery of Art, Washington, DC, before turning to cartooning. She discovered radio and the joys of presenting and researching music in lockdown, 2020, after the loss of her mother in January 2020, who also loved radio. Her cartoons and illustrations for work for the non-partisan UK website called PoliticalBetting.com. and for The Week online, and her work is archived by the British Library and the Victoria and Albert Museum, London, and the Jewish Museum, London.

References

British art historians
Women art historians
English cartoonists
1964 births
Living people
Harvard University alumni
Columbia University alumni
New York University alumni
Johns Hopkins University alumni